Dgebuadze is a Georgian surname, which may mean:
Dgebuadze (noble family), a noble family in Georgia
Alexandre Dgebuadze (born 1971), a Belgian chess grandmaster
Leon Dgebuadze (1897-1924), a Georgian politician shot in the Red Terror
Mariam Dgebuadze-Pularia (1887-1969), a Georgian female writer
Vladimeri Dgebuadze (born 1970), a Georgian judoka

Georgian-language surnames